= Nidaya =

Village

Coordinates: 23°19′23″N 91°19′49″E

Nidaya is a village in the state of Tripura, India. Seventy percent of the population work in agriculture, principally rice, in addition to potatoes, tomatoes, cabbage, and cauliflower. The village is bounded by Bhabanipur to the south and Manai Pathar in the north.
